Jan Friesinger (born 20 November 1980) is a German speed skater. He competed in three events at the 2002 Winter Olympics.

References

External links
 

1980 births
Living people
German male speed skaters
Olympic speed skaters of Germany
Speed skaters at the 2002 Winter Olympics
People from Bad Reichenhall
Sportspeople from Upper Bavaria